Dapeng is a subdistrict in the south east of Longgang District, in the prefecture-level city Shenzhen, in the Chinese province of Guangdong. In this area the main spoken dialects are Dapeng dialect and Bao'an Hakka.

Geography
The north of Dapeng borders to subdistrict Kuichong and the south borders Nan'ao Subdistrict. The three together form the region Dapeng Peninsula. Dapeng borders two seas, the Dapeng Wan and the Daya Wan.

Features
The Daya Bay Nuclear Power Station is located in at the east of the walled village Dapengcheng.

The biggest village is Wangmu; the headquarters of Dapeng is located there.

Villages:
Dapengcheng 大鹏城 
Xinwu 新屋 
Xiadakang 下大坑 
Guanyinshan 观音山 
Xiasha 下沙 
Shuitou 水头 
Longqicun 龙岐村 
Wangmuxu 王母虚 
Ling'ao 岭澳

Education
There is one secondary school ("middle school"), Dapeng Overseas Chinese Middle School (大鹏华侨中学). There is also one nine-year school (elementary and junior high school), Buxin School (布新学校).

Primary schools:
 Shenzhen Dapeng Central Primary School (深圳市大鹏新区大鹏中心小学)
 Shenzhen Dapeng No. 2 Primary School (深圳市大鹏新区大鹏第二小学)

References

External links

Dapeng
Subdistricts of Shenzhen